The Bangladesh Hockey Federation is the governing body of field hockey in Bangladesh. It is affiliated to IHF International Hockey Federation and AHF Asian Hockey Federation. The headquarters of the federation are in Dhaka, Bangladesh.

Air Chief Marshal Sheikh Abdul Hannan is the President of the Bangladesh Hockey Federation and Mominul Haque Sayed is the General Secretary.

Competitions
Hockey Champions Trophy Bangladesh
Dhaka Premier Division Hockey League
First Division Hockey League
Second Division Hockey League
National Hockey League
National Youth Hockey League
Independence Day Hockey Tournament
National Hockey Championship
National Youth Hockey Championship
Victory Day Hockey Tournament

See also
 Bangladesh men's national field hockey team
 Bangladesh women's national field hockey team

References

External links
 Bangladesh Hockey
 World League brightens Bangladesh hockey

Bangladesh
Hockey
Field hockey in Bangladesh